Lacu (born 1969 in Tampere as Kari Lahtinen), is a Finnish drummer best known for playing in the Finnish rock band Hanoi Rocks from their reformation in 2002 until his departure in 2008. He has also played with Popeda and Snakegod.

Before joining Hanoi Rocks, Lacu played with several Finnish bands like Dave Lindholm's Canpaza Gypsys. In his off-time from Hanoi Rocks he plays in a band called Siunattu Hulluus and he likes to jam with other small bands.

In 2002, Mikael Hakamies filled in for Lacu as the drummer of Snakegod whilst he was receiving hospital treatment.

References 

1969 births
Living people
musicians from Tampere
Hanoi Rocks members
Finnish rock drummers